Dharmapala Vidyalaya, Pannipitiya, established in 1942 on land owned by Anagarika Dharmapala, is the largest mixed school in Sri Lanka with about 8000 students and 600 academic staff. It is a public school and provides primary and secondary education.

Donation of the land 
The land of the current school was originally owned by Anagarika Dharmapala. Later it was donated by the  Don Hewawitharana Family to Mahabodhi Society and was allocated to Dharmapala Vidyalaya in 1940.

Current facilities

It provides education for students from grade 1 to G.C.E. advanced level with a range of facilities, including the largest international level cricket ground in Sri Lanka.

History
In 1940 an English secondary school was established at Pannipitiya as a branch of Ananda College Colombo. This new school was named Dharmapala Vidyalaya. On opening day two major events took place: the opening of late Sri Devamitta Dharmapala Thero Memorial building by the Minister of Health, W. A. de Silva, and the ceremonial opening of Dharmapala Vidyalaya by the General Manager of Buddhist Schools, Walter Wijeynaike.

Dharmapala Vidyalaya was managed by the Buddhist Theosophical Society under the direct supervision of the principal of Ananda College, Colombo 10. It was a school for boys and girls and conducted classes from Kindergarten to the Matriculation Form, in English. Dharmapala Vidyalaya began its work on 8 January 1941. Its founder was Patrick de Silva Kularatne and its principal was Dr. J. E. Jayasooriya.

During World War II a section from Ananda College- Colombo, along with the teachers, shifted to the Dharmapala Vidyalaya premises due to fear of war. To accommodate these students more Cadjan sheds were built. Later six permanent classrooms were built for the Primary Section. The then-principal of Ananda College, P. de S Kularathna, led this project. With the exit of Jayasooriya, D. C. Lawris took over as principal in 1943.

The school registered as an independent institute and a Class 1AB school for higher education. Up to H.S.C, many more students started entering Dharmapala. With the help of many donors and with the money collected by the students, another five classrooms were built for the Primary Section.

By February 1947 there were 1,420 students and H.S.C. classes were started. D.C. Lawris left Dharmapala Vidyalaya to take over as the principal of Ananda College, Colombo.

Houses
 - Shakya (ශාක්‍ය)
 - Maurya (මෞර්යය)
 - Nanda (නන්ද)
 - Soorya (සූර්ය)

Clubs and Societies 
There are over 40 active student organisations at the college.

Principals

Nortable alumini

Sports

The annual big match, the Battle of Golden Lions, between Dharmapala Vidyalaya and Rahula College is the major sport event in the school.

The Henry Steele Olcott Memorial Cricket Tournament is an annual cricket tournament conducted among the past cricketers of eight premier Buddhist schools in honor of Col. Olcott, the founder of Buddhist education in Sri Lanka.

References

1941 establishments in Ceylon
Educational institutions established in 1941
Buddhist schools in Sri Lanka
National schools in Sri Lanka
Schools in Colombo District